Bogan is a pejorative term used in Australia and New Zealand.

Bogan may also refer to:

 Bogan (surname)
 Bauchan, a being in Scottish folklore
 Boggart, a being in English folklore
 Bogan Pride, an Australian comedy television series
 Things Bogans Like, an Australian website and bestselling book
 Upper Middle Bogan, an Australian comedy television series
 Bogan (film), a 2017 Indian film
 A name for the dark side of the Force in the Star Wars universe

Places
 Bogan, Iran, a village in Khuzestan Province, Iran
 Bogan-e Bala, Iran 
 Bogan NSW 2825, a bounded rural locality in New South Wales
 Bogan Gate, a town in New South Wales
 Bogan Shire, a local government area in New South Wales
 Bogan River in New South Wales
 Bogandé Department, Burkina Faso
 Bogan High School (Chicago)